St. Astvatsatsin Monastery may refer to several ruins in the Nakhchivan Autonomous Republic of Azerbaijan:

St. Astvatsatsin Monastery (Bist)
St. Astvatsatsin Monastery (Channab)
St. Astvatsatsin Monastery (Kyrna)
St. Astvatsatsin Monastery (Norashen)
St. Astvatsatsin Monastery (Shurud)

See also
Mets Astvatsatsin Monastery (Yukhari Aylis)
St. Astvatsatsin Church (disambiguation)